Bocas del Toro is a district (distrito) of Bocas del Toro Province in Panama. The population according to the 2012 census  was 16,815; the latest official estimate (for 2019) is 21,396. The district covers a total area of 433.2 km². The capital lies at the town of Bocas del Toro. Major industries include tourism and agriculture.

Administrative divisions
Bocas del Toro District is divided administratively into the following corregimientos:

 Bocas del Toro
 Bastimentos
 Cauchero
 Punta Laurel
 Tierra Oscura

Table of Islands

Climate
Bocas del Toro is a coastal location with a tropical climate.  The area does not have a predictable dry season. The driest times are late August to mid-October, February, and March. Bocas del Toro is humid. Thundershowers and heavy rain are common. Normal temperatures are consistent all year (Hi: 83-90, low: 71-75). Due to its low latitude, sunrise is around 6 AM, and sunset is around 6 PM local time. These times vary slightly during the year. Weather data is collected at Bocas del Toro "Isla Colón" International Airport:

Transportation
The district consists of the Bocas del Toro Archipelago and a coastal mainland area. Ferries, water taxis, and private boats provide transportation to many locations. Buses connect boat docks and mainland commununities to adjacent districts and the rest of Panama. Bocas del Toro "Isla Colón" International Airport provides passenger and cargo flights to Panama and Costa Rica. Roads are usually dirt or gravel. Larger highways may be paved.

Infrastructure
Bocas del Toro is a rural district. Schools and medical clinics operate around the district. Sanitation is limited. Water filtration and treatment facilities are non-existent in most communities. Sewage treatment is non-existent. The government is working on building more infrastructure in rural areas.

See also
 List of islands of Panama

Notes

References

Districts of Bocas del Toro Province